Henry Darrow (born Enrique Tomás Delgado Jiménez; September 15, 1933 – March 14, 2021) was an American character actor of stage and film known for his role as Manolito "Mano" Montoya on the 1960s television series The High Chaparral. In film, Darrow played the corrupt and vengeful Trooper Hancock in The Hitcher.  During the 1970s and 1980s, he was seen in numerous guest starring television roles.  Darrow replaced Efrem Zimbalist Jr. as Zorro's father Don Alejandro de la Vega in the 1990s television series Zorro.

Early years 
Darrow was born in New York City, the first son of Gloria and Enrique Pío Delgado, who worked in the restaurant and clothing businesses. Darrow's parents had moved from Puerto Rico to New York in the early 1930s. At the age of eight, he played a woodcutter in a school play, an experience which convinced him that his destiny was as an actor.

In 1946, when Darrow was 13, his family returned to Puerto Rico, where he discovered his roots and grew to love the island he had not known. He graduated from Academia del Perpetuo Socorro high school in Miramar, Puerto Rico, as class president before enrolling in the University of Puerto Rico. There he studied political science and acting, and worked as a part-time English-language interpreter. During his third year at the University, he was awarded a scholarship (the first of its kind) to attend acting school. Thereupon Darrow moved to Los Angeles, where he enrolled in the Pasadena Playhouse. He met and married his first wife, Louise whom he referred to as Lucy, they went on to have two children, Denise and Tom. Darrow graduated with a Bachelor of Arts in theater arts.

Acting career 

Darrow had already landed small parts in 12 movies and 75 television series when he won the role in a 1965 stage production of The Wonderful Ice Cream Suit. This brought him to the attention of television producer David Dortort, who immediately recruited him for his television western series The High Chaparral, casting him as Manolito Montoya. Making its debut on American television in September 1967 (NBC), it lasted four seasons and was screened around the world. While on the show, both he and series' lead Cameron Mitchell became household names as the breakout stars of the show.

Darrow is the first Latino actor to portray Zorro on television. (José Suárez played Zorro in a 1953 Spanish film.) He starred in the series Zorro and Son and also has provided the voice for the animated series of The New Adventures of Zorro. He replaced Efrem Zimbalist, Jr. as Zorro's father from 1990–1994 in the Family Channel's successful series The New Zorro.

In 1972, Darrow co-founded the Screen Actors Guild Ethnic Minority Committee with actors Ricardo Montalbán, Edith Diaz and Carmen Zapata.

In 1974-75, Darrow portrayed police detective Manny Quinlan in the first season of Harry O starring David Janssen.  The character was killed off at the end of the first season in a re-tooling of the series.

In 1986, he appeared in the horror film The Hitcher as Trooper Hancock, a ruthless and vengeful policeman who would go above the law to kill the main protagonist (who was framed for the crimes by the main antagonist).

Later years 
Darrow was a member of the board of directors of the Screen Actors Guild (SAG) and a member of SAG's Ethnic Minorities Committee. He was also a founder of Nosotros, an organization helping Latino actors land non-stereotyped parts.  Darrow served on the Advisory Committee of Bilingual Children's Television. In his later years, Darrow had cut back on his public appearances.

Darrow died of natural causes on March 14, 2021, at the age of 87.

Filmography

Film appearance 

 Curse of the Undead (1959) - Roberto Robles (uncredited)
 Holiday for Lovers (1959) - Station Wagon Driver (uncredited)
 Revenge of the Virgins (1959) - Gunslinger Wade Connor
 The 3rd Voice (1960) - Hotel Papacio Clerk (uncredited)
 Cage of Evil (1960) - 2nd Mexican Policeman (uncredited)
 Sniper's Ridge (1961) - Pvt. Tonto
 Man-Trap (1961) - 1st Mexican Policeman (uncredited)
 Summer and Smoke (1961) - Drunk on Porch (uncredited)
 The Glass Cage (1964) - Police Lab Man
 The Dream of Hamish Mose (1969) - Mex
 Cancel My Reservation (1972) - Joe Little Cloud
 Brock's Last Case (1973, TV Movie) - Arthur Goldencorn
 Badge 373 (1973) - Sweet William
 Aloha Means Goodbye (1974, TV Movie) - Dr. David Kalani
 Exit Dying (1976, TV Movie)
 Halloween with the New Addams Family (1977, TV Movie) - Pancho Addams
 Computer Wizard (1977)
 Where's Willie? (1978) - Sheriff Charlie Wade
 Walk Proud (1979) - Mike Serrano
 A Life of Sin (1979)
 Attica (1980, TV Movie) - Herman Badillo
 Beyond the Universe (1981) - Coblenz
 St. Helens (1981) - Lloyd Wagner
 Birds of Paradise (1981) - Mario, 'The Jackal'
 Rooster (1982, TV Movie) - Dr. Sanchez
 Losin' It (1983) - Sheriff
 The Hitcher (1986) - Trooper Hancock
 Mission to Kill (1986) - Senor Borghini
 Death Blow (1987) - Chief Medina
 In Dangerous Company (1988) - Alex Aguilar
 L.A. Bounty (1989) - Lt. Chandler
 Blue Heat (1990) - Captain Joe Torres
 Percy and Thunder (1993, TV Movie) - Manuel Valencia
 Maverick (1994) - Riverboat Poker Player #4
 Criminal Passion (1994) - Captain Ramoz
 The Fight in the Fields (1999) - Doc
 Tequila Body Shots (1999) - Doctor
 Runaway Jury (2003) - Sebald
 The Writer's Pub (2005, Short) - Old Timer
 Angels with Angles (2005) - Raul
 A Girl Like Me: The Gwen Araujo Story (2006, TV Movie) - Papi
 Primo (2008) - Dr. Vasquez
 From Bubba with Love (2009)
 Soda Springs (2012) - El Quijano

Television appearance 
Darrow also appeared in hundreds of episodes of soap operas, miniseries, sitcoms and dramas, along with numerous stage plays. Television series in which he has appeared include: 

 Wagon Train (1959) - Benito DeVarga (credited as Henry Delgado)
 Stoney Burke (1963) - Mexican Border Policeman
 T.H.E. Cat (1966-1967) - Gregory Tyrole / Cosmo Pumbol
 Gunsmoke (1966-1967) - Ross Segurra / Oro
 The Wild Wild West (1967) - Archduke Maurice
 Bonanza (1967) - Amigo
 The High Chaparral (1967-1971) - Manolito Montoya
 Daniel Boone (1967) - Gideon
 The Big Valley (1969)
 Top of the Pops (1970) - guest on February 26 edition
 Mission: Impossible (1971) - Gregory Tolan
 Night Gallery (1971) - Dr. Juan Munos (segment "Cool Air")
 Bearcats! (1971) - Raoul Estaban - 2 episodes
 Hawaii Five-O (1971-1977) - Stewart Longworth / Billy Madrid / Johnny Oporta
 The Mod Squad (1972) - Israel Rivera
 Kung Fu (1973) - Don Emilio Fierro
 Kojak (1974) - Kevin Le Jeune
 Harry O (1974-1975) - Lt. Manuel 'Manny' Quinlan
 The Invisible Man (1975) - Dr. Nick Maggio
 McMillan and Wife (1975) - Inspector Jacques Arnaud
 The Streets of San Francisco (1976) - Ramon Montoya
 Sara (1976) - Angelo
 Baretta (1976) - Delgado
 The Six Million Dollar Man (1976) - Byron Falco
 Quincy, M.E. (1976-1982) - Dr. Tony Avila / Dr. Edward Herrera / Dr. Rivera
 Wonder Woman (1977) - David Allen / Walter Lampkin
 Centennial (1978) - Alvarez
 The Waltons (1979) - Barry Stone
 The Incredible Hulk (1981) - Patrero
 Simon & Simon (1981-1988) - Alejandro Agilar / Manuel Fernandez
 The New Adventures of Zorro (1981) - Don Diego / Zorro (voice)
 Seguin (1982) - Don Erasmo
 T.J. Hooker (1982–1986) - Gus Kalioki / Miguel Gomez / Dr. Frank Martinez
 Born to the Wild (1982) - Lost Robe
 Tales of the Gold Monkey (1983) - The Magistrate
 Jennifer Slept Here (1983) - Enrique
 Airwolf (1984) - Philip Maurice
 Magnum, P.I. (1985) - Will Kenikowa
 Fresno (1986 miniseries) - Commandante
 Knight Rider (1986) - Roderigo DeLorca
 Star Trek: The Next Generation (1988, Episode: "Conspiracy") - Adm. Savar
 The Golden Girls (1988) - Fidel Santiago
 Zorro (1990-1993) - Don Alejandro de la Vega
 Time Trax (1993) - The Chief
 Star Trek: Voyager (1995-1996) - Kolopak
 Babylon 5 (1997) - Dr. William Indiri

Soap opera performances include:
 General Hospital - Ambassador Tabris (1982) / DVX-backed Colonel (1987)
 Dynasty - (1982) - Ramon 
 Dallas (1983) - Garcia
 One Life to Live (1987) - Dante Medina
 Santa Barbara (1989-1992) - Rafael Castillo
  The Bold and the Beautiful (1998-2001) - Dr. Carlos Nunez

 Music videos 
In 1982, Darrow appeared as the prize wheel spinner in the music video for Santana's "Hold On", which was released as the lead single from their album Shangó. It was directed by John Mark Robinson.

 Awards 
 A Bambi Award, Germany's equivalent of the Emmys, for The High Chaparral.
 An Emmy  for his role in the soap opera Santa Barbara''.
 The Ricardo Montalbán/Nosotros Award. Darrow was the inaugural winner of the award for his contributions in improving Latinos image.
 The ALMA Awards Ricardo Montalbán Lifetime Achievement Award in 2012.
 The Miller Brewing Company honored Darrow by portraying him in its 2000 Hispanic-American Calendar.

See also 
 List of Puerto Ricans

Notes

References

External links 

 
 
 Interview with Henry Darrow – The Spectrum, November 2015.
 Interview with Henry Darrow at Classic Film & TV Cafe
 

1933 births
2021 deaths
American male film actors
American male soap opera actors
American male television actors
American people of Puerto Rican descent
Daytime Emmy Award winners
Daytime Emmy Award for Outstanding Supporting Actor in a Drama Series winners
Recipients of the Bambi (prize)
Male actors from New York City
Male actors from Los Angeles
Western (genre) television actors
University of Puerto Rico alumni